Operation Mare Nostrum was a year-long naval and air operation commenced by the Italian government on 18 October 2013, which brought at least 150,000 migrants to Europe, mainly from Africa and the Middle East. The operation ended on 31 October 2014 and was superseded by Frontex's Operation Triton.

Operation

The operation is named after ancient Roman name in Latin for the Mediterranean (Mare Nostrum, "Our Sea").

The European Commission provided financial support for the operation with €1.8 million from the External Borders Fund. Mare Nostrum was operated by the Italian Navy and saw ships operating near the coast of Libya.

The operation's search and rescue component is claimed by advocacy groups like the European Council on Refugees and Exiles to have saved thousands of lives, but the operation was politically unpopular and extremely costly for just one EU state. The Italian government requested support from the other EU member states, but the request was declined.

The operation ended on 31 October 2014 and was superseded by Frontex's Operation Triton, which operated a smaller search and rescue capability. Unlike Mare Nostrum, Operation Triton focused on border protection rather than search and rescue, and operated closer to the Italian coast. The termination of Mare Nostrum has been criticized as a cause of the increased death rate among migrants to Europe in the Mediterranean, which increased tenfold between 2014 and 2015. Two major migrant shipwreck disasters which together killed more than 1000 people within the span of a week in April 2015 led to calls to renew the operation.

Deployed assets
The operation involved units of the Italian Navy and Italian Air Force. The navy units deployed consisted of:
1 amphibious assault carrier with medical and shelter facilities for the would-be migrants;
1–2 frigates 
2 patrol vessels or corvettes with medical care;
San Marco Marine Brigade team in charge of vessels inspections and the safety of migrants on board;
coastal radar network and automatic identification system shore stations.

The air units involved helicopters, one MM P180 aircraft equipped with FLIR, two Camcopter S-100 unmanned aerial vehicles on board the ship  and two maritime patrol aircraft. There was also one forward logistic site in Lampedusa for logistics support. According to Italian Interior Minister Angelino Alfano, the government spent about €114 million  ($142 million) on Operation Mare Nostrum.

Foreign contributions

Slovenia was the sole external contributor to the operation. It provided its patrol vessel , which assisted in general surveillance of the waters surrounding Lampedusa from 15 December 2013 to the end of January the following year.

See also
2013 Lampedusa migrant shipwreck
2015 Libya migrant shipwrecks
Operation Triton
English Channel migrant crisis

References

2013 in Italy
2014 in Italy
European migrant crisis
Naval operations and battles